Sikeryali (سیکریالی  ) is a town and union council of Gujrat District, in the Punjab province of Pakistan. It is part of Kharian Tehsil and is located at 32°37'0N 73°49'0E with an altitude of 223 metres (734 feet).

These villages are included in Union Council,
 Sikeryali
 Topa Adam
 Topa Usman
 Matwanwala 
 Gumti Shareef 
 Gratia

 Chakora
Ch Salam Hussain Rehaniya a member of very powerful family in Sikeryali and son of landlord name Ch Sabir Hussain Rehaniya. He was born in Germany and his Higher Education is from Pakistan. Also known for his Honesty, Bravery, and Loyalty to his village and family.

Local elections was held in UC on 31 October 2015 and Ch Sadaqat Hussain chohan (PTI) won by a huge lead against Mian Ghulam Ahmad brother of Ex Nazim UC Sikeryali Mian Khalid Rafiq. 

Ch Sadaqat Hussain chohan is a  Chairman of UC Sikeryali. He is younger brother of Ch Sharafat Husain chohan (Advocate ) Ex Gen Sec. Pakistan Tehrik e Insaf (PTI) GURJAT.
Syed faiz ul hassan shah from kulewal syedan is a MNA of UC sikeryali. Mian Akhtar hayat kolten Shah Hussain is the MPA of that locality. Both are from PTI.

Ch Ijaz Ahmed Mehr is the Lambardar they are a family of zamindars of the village or town, a state-privileged status which is hereditary and has wide ranging governmental powers. With younger brother Sajjad Haider.

References

Union councils of Gujrat District
Populated places in Gujrat District

Tehsil Khariann